The Hidden Children is a 1917 American silent historical drama film directed by Oscar Apfel and starring Harold Lockwood, May Allison and Lillian West. It is based on a 1914 novel by Robert W. Chambers, set in Colonial America. Location shooting took place in the San Bernardino Mountains.

Cast
 Harold Lockwood as Evan Loskiel 
 May Allison as Lois de Contrecoeur 
 Lillian West as Jeeanne de Contrrecoeur 
 Henry Hebert as Mayaro 
 George A. McDaniel as Amochol 
 Lester Cuneo as Lt. Boyd 
 Albert Ellis as Cavert
 Lillian Hayward as Mrs. Rannock 
 Howard Davies as Gen. Sullivan 
 Daniel Davis as Hiaowoc 
 Clara Lucas as Marie Loskiel 
 Arthur Allardt as Capt. Jean de Contrecoeur 
 Charles Cummings as Guy Johnson

References

Bibliography
 Lowe, Denise. An Encyclopedic Dictionary of Women in Early American Films: 1895-1930. Routledge, 2014.

External links
 

1917 films
1910s historical films
American silent feature films
American historical films
American black-and-white films
Films directed by Oscar Apfel
Metro Pictures films
Films set in the 18th century
Films based on works by Robert W. Chambers
1910s English-language films
1910s American films